Federico Mandatori, also known as Federico Biaggi, is a Grand Prix motorcycle racer from Italy. He is Max Biaggi's nephew.

Career statistics

By season

Races by year

References

External links
 Profile on motogp.com
 Profile on worldsbk.com

1987 births
Living people
Italian motorcycle racers
125cc World Championship riders
FIM Superstock 1000 Cup riders
Sportspeople from Rome